Oregon Route 52 (OR 52) is a very short Oregon state highway that runs from OR 201 at Payette Junction, Oregon, to the Snake River (the Idaho state line) at Payette, Idaho. It is a continuation of ID 52 and was once signed as Oregon Route 90.  OR 52 consists of the Payette Spur No. 492 (see Oregon highways and routes).

Route description
OR 52 begins at an intersection with OR 201 at Payette Junction and continues south to the Idaho state line at Payette, Idaho, where it continues as ID 52.

History 
The Payette Spur was designated OR 90 in 1932 and renumbered OR 52 in 1952.

Major intersections

References 

"Olds Ferry-Ontario Highway No. 455"

052
Transportation in Malheur County, Oregon